The Do Quati River is a river of Paraná state in southern Brazil. It is a tributary of the Corvo River just before that in turn flows into the Paranapanema.

See also
List of rivers of Paraná

References
Brazilian Ministry of Transport
Ribeirão do Quati at GeoNames
Rivers of Paraná (state)